The Olympic Desert Eagle was an American homebuilt aircraft that was designed and produced by Olympic Ultralights of Port Angeles, Washington. When it was available the aircraft was supplied as a kit for amateur construction.

Design and development
The Desert Eagle featured a strut-braced high-wing, a two-seats-in-side-by-side configuration semi-enclosed cockpit, fixed tricycle landing gear without wheel pants and a single engine in pusher configuration.

The aircraft was made from bolted-together aluminum tubing, with its flying surfaces covered in Dacron sailcloth.

The manufacturer estimated the construction time from the supplied kit to be 240 hours.

Operational history
In February 2015 no examples were currently registered in the United States with the Federal Aviation Administration, as the sole one's registration had expired on 30 September 2013.

Variants
Desert Eagle
Base model
Desert Eagle Ag-Wagon
Agricultural aircraft model reported as under development in 1998

Specifications (Desert Eagle)

References

Desert Eagle
1990s United States sport aircraft
1990s United States ultralight aircraft
1990s United States civil utility aircraft
Single-engined pusher aircraft
High-wing aircraft
Homebuilt aircraft